Stan Kasten (born February 1, 1952) is the former president of the Atlanta Braves and the Washington Nationals, and the current president and part-owner of the Los Angeles Dodgers. Long involved in Atlanta professional sports, he also served as general manager of the NBA's Atlanta Hawks and president of the NHL's Atlanta Thrashers.

Early life and education
Kasten was born to a Jewish family, the son of Holocaust survivors, Sylvia and Nathan Kasten. He has one sister, Mimi Werbler and one brother, Mitchel Kasten. Kasten attended Orthodox Jewish schools. He graduated from Columbia Law School while living in John Jay Hall. He is also a graduate of New York University. He had also attended Ner Israel Rabbinical College as a high school student for a short time before graduating from the Yeshiva University High School for Boys in 1969.

Career
Kasten was a longtime fixture in Atlanta professional sports primarily due to his association with Ted Turner. It started in 1979, when at age 27 he became the youngest general manager in the National Basketball Association, for the Atlanta Hawks. He held this position until 1990, while becoming the Hawks' president in 1986. During his lengthy tenure in the Hawks' front office, Kasten became the first (and so far the only) NBA executive to win back-to-back NBA Executive of the Year awards, accomplishing this feat in 1986 and 1987. He was also able to build Atlanta into a perennial playoff contender. Led by the Hall of Fame play of superstar Dominique Wilkins, Kasten's Hawks achieved four straight 50-win seasons (1986–1989) and set franchise records in attendance. In the 1990s, he guided Atlanta to a stretch of seven consecutive playoff appearances.

Kasten would also become president of the Atlanta Braves in 1986. From 1987 to 2003, the Braves won more games than any other team in major league baseball. As president of the Braves, he delegated all baseball decisions to Atlanta GM John Schuerholz, who put together strong, talented teams that consistently competed for the World Series.  The Braves of that time, under the stellar on-field managerial leadership of Bobby Cox, were centered on a powerful pitching staff which featured Greg Maddux, Tom Glavine, Steve Avery and John Smoltz. They also featured All-Star third baseman Chipper Jones, who is regarded as one of the best hitters in Braves' history as well as one of the best switch-hitters and third basemen ever. From 1991 to 2005, the Braves won 14 straight division titles, 5 National League pennants and the World Series championship in 1995 (The 1994 season was ended prematurely, without titles or postseason play, cut short by the players' strike.)

In 1999, when the National Hockey League would award an expansion team to Atlanta, Kasten became president of the Atlanta Thrashers as well as chairman of the newly built Philips Arena. He held all these positions - presidency of the Braves and Thrashers and chair of the Philips Arena - until he stepped down in 2003.

He assumed the presidency of the Washington Nationals in 2006 under the Lerner family ownership group. It was reported on September 23, 2010 that Kasten would step down as Nationals' team president.

In January 2012, Kasten joined Magic Johnson, Peter Guber and Guggenheim Baseball Management bidding for ownership of the Los Angeles Dodgers baseball team.  On March 27 it was reported that the partnership, led by Guggenheim controlling partner Mark Walter, had submitted a winning bid of $2.15 billion (including surrounding land)—some 25% above the nearest offer. Kasten became team president once the sale closed, on April 30, 2012.

Personal life
He is married to Helen Weisz Kasten, and has four children.

Notes

External links
Q&A with Stan Kasten
 Stan Kasten Q&A Scout.com

1952 births
Sportspeople from Lakewood Township, New Jersey
Businesspeople from Atlanta
Atlanta Braves executives
Atlanta Hawks executives
Atlanta Thrashers executives
Los Angeles Dodgers executives
Washington Nationals owners
Washington Nationals executives
Jewish American baseball people
Kasten, Stan
Columbia Law School alumni
Rutgers University alumni
Major League Baseball team presidents
National Basketball Association general managers
National Basketball Association team presidents
Los Angeles Dodgers owners
Major League Baseball executives
21st-century American Jews